Shay Abutbul (born 16 January 1983) is an Israeli former football player.

Career

Shay Abutbul began his career in the youth ranks of top Israeli side Hapoel Tel Aviv. After impressing with the youth side, Shay was called up to the first team in 2002. Since then Abutbul has been one of the top players for the club. During his time with Hapoel he has helped the club capture the Israeli Cup on two occasions and qualify for the UEFA Cup. During the 2008/08 season Shay appeared in 20 league matches scoring 3 goals, he also appeared in 6 UEFA Cup matches scoring 1 goal.
It was reported that he has an offer from New York Red Bulls from the MLS.

International

Abutbul has represented Israel at the Under 19 and Under 21 level. He also served as captain of the under 21 side.

Honours 
Israeli Cup (5):
2006, 2007, 2010, 2011, 2012
Israeli Premier League (1):
2009–10

Personal life 
Shay married his girlfriend Keren in May 2005. They have four children.

References

ifotbol.com

1983 births
Living people
Israeli footballers
Israeli Jews
Hapoel Tel Aviv F.C. players
Maccabi Sha'arayim F.C. players
Israeli Premier League players
Footballers from Bat Yam
Israeli people of Moroccan-Jewish descent
Association football midfielders